Dato’ Seri Mohamed Nazri bin Abdul Aziz (Jawi: محمد نظري بن عبدالعزيز; born 15 May 1954) is a Malaysian politician and diplomat who has served as Malaysian Ambassador to the United States since February 2023. He served as the Minister of Tourism and Culture from May 2013 to May 2018, Minister in the Prime Minister's Department in charge of legal affairs from March 2004 to May 2013, Minister of Entrepreneur Development from December 1999 to March 2004, Deputy Minister of Finance I from November 1996 to December 1999, Deputy Minister in the Prime Minister's Department from May 1995 to November 1996 and the Member of Parliament (MP) for Padang Rengas from March 2004 to November 2022.

Early life and education 

Mohamed Nazri bin Abdul Aziz was born in Kuala Kangsar, Perak, Malaysia. He is the alumnus of Malay College Kuala Kangsar. He has an educational background in law and is qualified as a barrister of Lincoln's Inn.

Political career 
At the grassroots level, Nazri was elected Exco of the Malaysian UMNO Youth Movement in 1978. He was later appointed as UMNO Youth Vice Chief in 1993 before acting as UMNO Youth Chief from the following year until 1996.

He was also appointed as the Chairman of the International Affairs Bureau of the Malaysian UMNO Youth Movement from 1986 to 1996 and the Chairman of the Barisan Nasional Malaysia Youth from 1990 to 1994. In addition, he was also appointed as a Member of the UMNO Supreme Council from 1990 to 2018.

He was appointed chairman of MARA from 17 March 1993 to 23 July 1995, Deputy Minister in the Prime Minister's Department from 1995 to 1999 and Deputy Minister of Finance II since 1999 until the dissolution of the Cabinet ahead of the general election in December 1999. He was later appointed Minister of Entrepreneur Development until 2004.

His experience as a Member of Parliament began after winning the Chenderoh parliamentary seat on the Barisan Nasional ticket in the 1995 Malaysian general election which he later successfully defended in the next term, (1999-2004). In addition, he was appointed Senator of the Senate from 1991 to 1995.

In the 2004 Malaysian general election, he moved to the Padang Rengas parliamentary seat as a result of the demarcation by the Election Commission of Malaysia (EC). He managed to win it after defeating the PKR candidate, Mohd Zolkafli bin Yahaya. He managed to retain the seat in 2008, 2013 and 2018 general elections.

Nazri was originally the Minister in the Prime Minister's Department in charge of legal affairs and judicial reform since 2004. After the 2008 general election, which saw the ruling Barisan Nasional coalition's majority in Parliament significantly reduced, the then Prime Minister Abdullah Ahmad Badawi reshuffled his cabinet and gave Nazri's legal affairs portfolio to Zaid Ibrahim but only lasted for 6 months when Zaid resigned in September 2008. He was the Minister in the Prime Minister's Department in charge of law and parliamentary affairs .

Controversies and criticism

Racism allegation 	
In June 2005, Nazri caused controversy when he shouted the phrase "racist" (or variants of it) 28 times in Parliament against the Member of the Opposition, M. Kulasegaran. A request by opposition Democratic Action Party (DAP) lawmaker Fong Po Kuan for Nazri to take back his comments went unheeded. The incident occurred during a debate on the Malaysian Medical Council's derecognition of Crimea State Medical University (CSMU) medical degrees; most Malaysian students sent to study there were of Indian extraction. Nazri has since used the phrase "bloody racist" on Tun Dr. Mahathir because the latter supports a controversial government programme that allegedly indoctrinates racist sentiments in civil servants and public university students.

Statement over the 1988 Judicial crisis	
Opposition Member of Parliament Karpal Singh said Nazri had misled Parliament when he said judges involved in the 1988 Judicial crisis were not sacked but were asked to take early retirement. Former Prime Minister Mahathir Mohamad also refuted Nazri's suggestion saying Tun Salleh Abas and two of the five other judges involved in the 1988 judicial crisis had not been dismissed but were asked to retire early. He said Salleh Abas was sacked as Lord President but obtained a pension on grounds of compassion.

Defender of high-profile politician 	
In 2006, he been called the hatchetman of Abdullah Ahmad Badawi, then Prime Minister of Malaysia, by former Prime Minister Mahathir Mohamad, for defending Abdullah in Mahathir's ongoing criticisms against the government.
	
In 2009, photos surfaced of a woman and a man rumoured to be Nazri in a compromising position but several politicians who were close to him said the man in the pictures is not him.
	
In September 2010, he came out openly in the defence of Prime Minister Najib's 1Malaysia policy, saying that he is a Malaysian first and a Malay next. This is in complete opposition to that expressed by the Deputy Prime Minister, Muhyiddin Yassin, who has time and again reiterated that he is Malay first and Malaysian second.

High tourism tax fee plans 	
In 2016, he was criticised for his decision of threatening to stop tourism funding from his ministry to Sabah and Sarawak if both the states did not implement a proposed tourism service tax fee of between RM5 and RM30 on each hotel room booking. In response to his statement, the Sabah State Tourism, Environment and Culture Assistant Minister Pang Nyuk Ming stated:	

	
Following criticism over his tourism tax fee plan by Sarawak State Tourism, Arts, Culture, Youth and Sports Minister Abdul Karim Rahman Hamzah, Nazri responded by chiding the minister by calling him a “greenhorn” and “behaving like a gangster”. His response received backlash from other government-allied parties who perceived his words as being “too rude” and “far from being constructive”. Abdul Rahman Dahlan was attacked with similar words after Nazri perceived him as being defensive towards Karim. As a result of his comment, the Sarawak state government made a decision to withdraw their participation from Tourism Malaysia. Nazri continued with his stance and said he did not regret the Sarawak decision while stressing that he did not intend to punish Sarawak and would be fair towards the state. According to Nazri, he was forced to make the remarks against the Sarawak minister after being accused of eroding and not respecting the Sarawak state rights. Nazri also questioned the Sarawak state government for not expressing their objections  several months earlier in Parliament and the Cabinet, to which the DAP also claimed they had been opposing the bill alone at the time without the support from any of the Sabah and Sarawak government-allied politicians.
	
However, according to Sabah State Tourism, Culture, and Environment Minister, Masidi Manjun, both states had indeed objected the proposed tax in the previous year before its tabling in the Parliament, whereas the federal government continued to enact the Tourism Tax Act 2017 to impose a levy on all tourists. Nevertheless, as stated by Sarawak DAP chairman Chong Chieng Jen: once a bill is tabled in Parliament without any opposition from the members of parliament (MPs) of the government-allied parties during the session, the bill is sure to be approved because of the sheer number of the ruling government MPs  in Parliament. He further blamed the six Sarawak MPs who were Federal Ministers (see Cabinet of Malaysia) for failing to oppose the tourism tax proposal during its tabling in the previous parliamentary session. In response to the ongoing criticism, Natural Resources and Environment Minister Wan Junaidi Tuanku Jaafar explained to the media that in the spirit of collective responsibility practised in Commonwealth countries, Sarawakian parliamentarians who are cabinet members cannot object to the ruling government coalition's decision in the Parliament and telling the media to ask any MPs who do not have any ministerial posts to find the answer. Prior to this, Lubok Antu MP William Nyallau Badak was contacted by the media and he said not all Sarawak and Sabah MPs supported the proposed Tourism Tax. In his statement:	
	
The Sarawak MP however felt that the federal government should have consulted and sought approval from their state Chief Minister Abang Abdul Rahman Zohari Abang Openg first before announcing its implementation which would impact Sarawak's tourism industry. On 14 June, Nazri said his spat with Karim and three federal ministers from East Malaysia had come to an end under the “Barisan Nasional (BN) spirit”, adding that it was unnecessary for him to withdraw his previous remarks or apologise to Karim and that the tourism tax would come into effect from 1 July 2017, which later deferred to 1 August.

Turn floods into Kelantan tourist attractions
On 16 February 2018, Nazri said Kelantan is filled with possible tourist attractions that the state have failed to capitalise on to enrich the Kelantanese. He said even the floods which ravage the state every monsoon season can be turned into a tourism opportunity.

Racial views
On 24 February 2019, in his campaign speech, he questioned the appointment of non-Muslims to the posts of Attorney General, Chief Justice and Finance Minister, seeing it as a threat to Malay special rights. He also warned non-bumiputeras not to question Malay special rights, using vernacular schools as an example of the special rights given to non-Malays.On 25 February, Nazri denied that he had called for vernacular school to be closed nationwide. He said remarks in the matter made during his ceramah during the Semenyih by-election campaign made at Beranang was purposely taken out of context to confuse people and the voters in Semenyih.

2020–2022 Malaysian political crisis
 
Nazri is a member and Division Chairman of Padang Rengas of the United Malays National Organisation (UMNO), a component party of the ruling BN coalition which is aligned with another ruling Perikatan Nasional (PN) coalition. However, on 12 January 2021, he publicly and personally announced his withdrawal of support and he was no longer aligned with PN as an MP although his coalition is, resulting in collapse of the PN administration led by Prime Minister Muhyiddin Yassin after PN lost the majority support by commanding the support of only 109 out of 220 MPs (at least 111) in the Dewan Rakyat, Parliament. His withdrawal of support was the third one from his coalition after the withdrawals of support of Tengku Razaleigh Hamzah (Gua Musang MP) and Ahmad Jazlan Yaakub (Machang MP). But in July 2021, he publicly said he supported back the Perikatan Nasional government that led by Prime Minister Muhyiddin Yassin.

Personal life 

He is married and has a daughter and three sons named Ferasha Mohamed Nazri, Mohamed Ferhad Mohamed Nazri and Mohamed Nedim Mohamed Nazri. Then, he married Haflin Saiful and has a son named Jean Pierre Azize Mohamed Nazri.

In January 2021, Nazri was tested positive for COVID-19 and warded at the Hospital Raja Perempuan Zainab in Kota Baru.

Election results

Honours
  :
  Knight Commander of the Order of the Life of the Crown of Kelantan (DJMK) - Dato' (2011)
  :
  Companion Class I of the Order of Malacca (DMSM) - Datuk (1993)

  :
  Grand Knight of the Order of Sultan Ahmad Shah of Pahang (SSAP) - Dato' Sri (2008)
  :
  Knight Grand Commander of the Order of the Perak State Crown (SPMP) - Dato' Seri (2000)

References 

Living people
1954 births
People from Perak
Malaysian people of Malay descent
Malaysian Muslims
20th-century Malaysian lawyers
United Malays National Organisation politicians
Members of the Dewan Rakyat
Members of the Dewan Negara
Government ministers of Malaysia
Members of Lincoln's Inn
21st-century Malaysian politicians